Ana Mae Diaz de Endara (born May 16, 1967) was the First Lady of Panama from 1990–1994. 

A Panamanian of Chinese origin, Diaz met future president Guillermo Endara in September 1989, while he was on hunger strike to protest the autocratic military rule of Manuel Noriega. Diaz was a law student at the time. The former First Lady-desdignate, Marcela Endara, Guillermo's wife of 28 years, had died in June of a heart attack while Endara was hospitalized due to a beating by Noriega's forces. International observers had reported Endara to be the clear leader in the May presidential election, and — although he had earlier showed discomfort with US patronage — during the US invasion of Panama in December, he was sworn in as president from the safety of a US military base in the Canal Zone. 

Panamanian newspapers began to publish photographs of Diaz and Endara together in January 1990, and Endara told press the pair were "going out".

First Lady of Panama

The pair married on June 11, 1990, within 9 months of having first met, in a wedding attended by the ambassadors of various nations. Endara was reportedly so happy in the marriage that he would even be described as allegedly leaving cabinet meetings for a "quick cuddle".

Unsympathetic press coverage; and later life

Due in part to the couple's difference in ages and weights—Endara was in his mid-fifties, already a grandfather, and — despite his hunger strike — known for his weight; Ana Mae Díaz was 23—the marriage received widespread coverage and mockery in the Panamanian press, including a new nickname for Endara, El Gordo Feliz ("Happy Fatty"). 

Endara ran for president again in 2004 and in 2009, placing second and a distant third, respectively. On September 28, 2009, he died at age 73 at his home in Panama City, of a heart attack.

See also

 First ladies and gentlemen of Panama

References 

Living people
1960s births
First ladies and gentlemen of Panama
Panamanian people of Chinese descent